German submarine U-90 was a Type VIIC U-boat of Nazi Germany's Kriegsmarine during World War II.

She was laid down at the Flender Werke in Lübeck as yard number 294 on 1 October 1940, launched on 25 October 1941 and commissioned on 20 December with Oberleutnant zur See Hans-Jürgen Oldörp in command.

After training with the 8th U-boat Flotilla, U-90 was assigned to the 9th flotilla on 1 July 1942 for operations. She was a member of one wolfpack in a patrol in which she was sunk by a Canadian warship.

Design
German Type VIIC submarines were preceded by the shorter Type VIIB submarines. U-90 had a displacement of  when at the surface and  while submerged. She had two shafts and two  propellers.

U-90 was fitted with five  torpedo tubes (four fitted at the bow and one at the stern), fourteen torpedoes, one  SK C/35 naval gun, 220 rounds, and a  C/30 anti-aircraft gun. The boat had a complement of between forty-four and sixty.

Service history

Patrol and Loss
Having departed Kiel on 30 June 1942, the boat hugged the southern Norwegian coast before turning west and sailing through the gap separating the Faroe and Shetland Islands. She was attacked and sunk by depth charges from the Canadian destroyer St. Croix  in the Northern Atlantic on 24 July.

Wolfpacks
U-90 took part in one wolfpack, namely.
 Wolf (13 – 24 July 1942)

References

Bibliography

External links

German Type VIIC submarines
U-boats commissioned in 1941
U-boats sunk in 1942
U-boats sunk by depth charges
U-boats sunk by Canadian warships
World War II submarines of Germany
World War II shipwrecks in the Atlantic Ocean
1941 ships
Ships built in Lübeck
Ships lost with all hands
Maritime incidents in July 1942